Kulp is a Turkish rock band formed in 2007.

In 2011, Kulp released a debut album titled "Kulp".

Members
 Kerem Olgaç - Bass Guitar, Back vocal
 Çağdaş Turan - Vocal, Rhythm guitar
 Murat Altun - Drummer, percussion
 Ömer Cem Harnak - Lead Guitar
 Onat Artun - Organ

Discography
Kulp (Sony Music) (2011)

 "Anlatamam"
 "Tül Perde"
 "Yancı"
 "Ayvalık Otogarı"
 "Seni Aramam İçin"
 "Beyoğlu"
 "Gün Akşam Olduğunda"
 "Sarı Sıcak Şehirlere Yolculuk"
 "Yoruldum"
 "Gecenin Karası"
 "Beyoğlu (acoustic)"

Para Gani (Sony Music) (2013)

 "Para Gani"
 "Yalan Dünya"
 "Yasak Aşk"
 "Yine Geldim Bu Dünyaya"
 "Tül Perde"
 "Yine de"
 "Sokak Çocuğu"
 "Sorma"
 "Bar Kuşu"
 "Hacı"

Video Clips

Ayvalık Otogarı

References

External links
  Official Site
  Facebook Official Site

Turkish rock music groups
Musical groups established in 2007